Charles Fredrick Wiesenthal (1726–1789) was a German physician and inventor who was awarded the patent for the first known mechanical device for sewing in 1755. One might argue that he invented the sewing machine. He was born in the state of Brandenburg, Germany, but was in England at the time of invention, and lived from 1755 to 1789 in Baltimore. For his invention of a double pointed needle with an eye at one end, he received the British Patent No. 701 (1755), but after in 1830 Barthélemy Thimonnier reinvented the sewing machine.

References

1726 births
1789 deaths
18th-century German inventors
Sewing equipment
Physicians from Brandenburg
German philanthropists
German surgeons
German emigrants to the United States